The list of shipwrecks in 1791 includes ships sunk, foundered, wrecked, grounded or otherwise lost during 1791.

January

8 January

20 January

21 January

31 January

Unknown date

p

February

4 February

19 February

26 February

28 February

Unknown date

March

7 March

20 March

Unknown date

April

29 April

Unknown date

May

Unknown date

June

2 June

Unknown date

July

5 July

Unknown date

August

10 August

12 August

24 August

29 August

Unknown date

September

1 September

2 September

3 September

30 September

Unknown date

October

4 October

19 October

25 October

Unknown date

November

6 November

17 November

25 November

27 November

Unknown date

December

4 December

6 December

12 December

24 December

Unknown date

Unknown date

Free Briton The ship foundered in the Adriatic Sea off Venice while on a voyage from Great Yarmouth, Norfolk to Venice.

References

1791